Velletri Cathedral is a Roman Catholic cathedral in Velletri in the region of Lazio, Italy, dedicated to Saint Clement, pope and martyr. It is the episcopal seat of the Suburbicarian Diocese of Velletri-Segni.

History
A previous church on the site dated from the 4th century, but was rebuilt in 1660. The present crypt derives from the earlier church. The cathedral contains an altarpiece depicting the Coronation of the Virgin by Giovanni Balducci.

References

Churches in the metropolitan city of Rome
Cathedrals in Lazio
Cathedral
Roman Catholic cathedrals in Italy
Roman Catholic churches completed in 1660
17th-century Roman Catholic church buildings in Italy
1660 establishments in Italy